Disappointment Creek is a stream in North Slope Borough, Alaska, in the United States. It is a tributary of the Utukok River

Disappointment Creek was so named when a surveyor found the creek did not lead to a gap in the De Long Mountains.

See also
List of rivers of Alaska

References

Rivers of North Slope Borough, Alaska
Rivers of Alaska